A hybrid bond graph is a graphical description of a physical dynamic system with discontinuities (i.e., a hybrid dynamical system).  Similar to
a regular bond graph, it is an energy-based technique. However, it allows instantaneous switching of the junction structure, which may violate the principle of continuity of power (Mosterman and Biswas, 1998).

References 
 Pieter Mosterman and Gautam Biswas, 1998: "A Theory of Discontinuities in Physical System Models" in Journal of the Franklin Institute, Volume 335B, Number 3, pp. 401-439, January, 1998.

Further reading 
 Pieter Mosterman, 2001: "HyBrSim - A Modeling and Simulation Environment for Hybrid Bond Graphs" in Journal of Systems and Control Engineering, vol. 216, Part I, pp. 35-46, 2002.
 Cuijpers, P.J.L., Broenink, J.F., and Mosterman P.J., 2008: "Constitutive Hybrid Processes: a Process-Algebraic Semantics for Hybrid Bond Graphs" in SIMULATION, vol. 84, No. 7, pages 339-358, 2008. 

Bond graph